Michelangelo Naccherino (Florence, March 6, 1550 – Naples, February, 1622) was an Italian sculptor and architect, active mainly in the Kingdom of Naples, Italy.

He supposedly was a pupil of Giambologna in Florence, but due to disagreements moved to the Kingdom of Naples in 1573. From 1575-1577, he was active in Palermo, where he worked alongside Camillo Camilliani in the construction of the Fontana Pretoria, a project of Francesco Camilliani.

Returning to Naples, he completed a number of Mannerist projects such as the tomb of Alfonso Sanchez (1588–89) in the Basilica of Santissima Annunziata Maggiore and a crucifix (1599) for the church of San Carlo all'Arena. He also completed a Madonna della Sanità  for the church of Santa Maria della Sanità in the zone of Materdei, where he lived.

In the early 1600s, he participated in a variety of projects, including the Fontana di Santa Lucia and the Fontana del Gigante (along with Pietro Bernini). In 1607, he submitted a design for the  Cappella del Tesoro di San Gennaro, in which he competed against Ceccardo Bernucci, Giovan Battista Cavagna, Giulio Cesare Fontana, Giovan Giacomo Di Conforto, Dionisio Nencioni di Bartolomeo, Francesco Grimaldi, and Giovanni Cola di Franco. The latter two won the competition.

In 1612, he completed some tombs in the church of  Santo Stefano  in Capri, and in 1616, he returned to Florence to sculpt an ‘’Adam and Eve’’ for the Boboli Gardens.  Among those who worked with him were Giuliano Finelli, Francesco Cassano, Tommaso Montani, Angelo Landi, and Mario Marasi.

Other works
 Pietà, Chapel of Palazzo of Monte di Pietà
 Fontana di Santa Lucia (Villa Reale)
 Fontana del Gigante (con Pietro Bernini)
 Statue, Fontana del Nettuno
 Madonna del Carmine, San Giovanni a Carbonara
 Bust of Fabrizio Pignatelli, Church of Santissima Trinità dei Pellegrini
 Christ Risen, Certosa di San Martino
 Tomb of Ferdinando Maiorca, Pontificia Reale Basilica of San Giacomo degli Spagnoli, Naples
 Christ at the Column, Museo Lázaro Galdiano, Madrid, Spain
 Virgin and Child, Jesus Nazareno church, Cudillero, Spain
 Funerary statue of García de Barrionuevo (bronze), San Ginés church, Madrid, Spain

Bibliography
 Antonino Maresca di Serracapriola, Sulla vita e sulle opere di Michelangelo Naccherino: appunti, Francesco Giannini & figli, Napoli 1890
 Antonino Maresca di Serracapriola, Michelangelo Naccherino scultore fiorentino allievo di Giambologna: sua vita, sue opere, opere del suo aiuto Tomaso Montani e del principale suo allievo Giuliano Finelli: con ventinove autotipie, tipo-ed. meridionale anonima T.E.M.A., Napoli 1924
  Francesco Cibarelli, La Chiesa di San Carlo all'Arena e il Cristo del Naccherino, Francesco Giannini & figli, Napoli 1926
 Franco Strazzullo, Sul crocefisso marmoreo di Michelangelo Naccherino, Archivio Storico Napoletano, Napoli 1952
 Michael Kuhlemann, Michelangelo Naccherino: Skulptur zwischen Florenz und Neapel um 1600, Waxmann, Münster 1999,  

1550 births
1622 deaths
16th-century Italian sculptors
Italian male sculptors
17th-century Italian sculptors